The Göteborg Australian Rules Football Club (Garfc), nicknamed The Berserkers, is an Australian rules football team in Gothenburg, Sweden, playing in the Southern Sweden Regional League.



History 

The Berserkers started training in 2003 and had their first seven-a-side game in late 2003. In 2007, they competed against South Sweden, Stockholm, and Karlstad. In 2009, Garfc played against Helsingborg and Karlstad. During 2008, Garfc also participated in an internal Gothenburg 9-a-side league where players living in the eastern part of town played for the East Lions and players from the western areas played for the West Crowns. Team membership depended on which of the two Skansar a player lived closest to: (Skansen Kronan or Skansen Lejonet).

Colours and Jumper 

The Berserkers wear a black no-sleeve jumper with a yellow diagonal stripe (a gift from Richmond Tigers). In cold weather, they wear a black and white striped long sleeve jumper (a gift from Collingwood Magpies).

See also

References

Australian rules football clubs in Sweden
2003 establishments in Sweden
Australian rules football clubs established in 2003